The Austrian Volley League Women (AVL), formerly known as the  Women VolleyLeague (WVL), is the 1st women's volleyball league in Austria and it is a part of the Austrian Volleyball Association. It is organized as an Independent association since 2002.

League Mode 
The Austrian Volley League for Women is divided into the following phases 

 Main passage
 Master playoff
 Relegation
 U21 competition

The Main passage has a maximum of ten participants, including the two volleyball teams participating in the Central European Volleyball League (Central European Volleyball Zonal Association (MEVZA), play in a main round placement mode for the qualification of the play-off-Phase.

Master play-offs 
The quarter-finals and semi-finals take place in the best of five mode. The team with the better placement in the main round has the home advantage in the first game, then it changes with every game. The final takes place in the best of seven mode game.

A special feature of the Austrian Volley League is that the losers teams in the quarter-finals play for placement from 5 to 8 place.

The losers in the semi-finals also play for the Third place. All games for 3rd to 8th place will be played in best of three mode.

Round of Expectations 
The last four teams of the main round play in the Austrian Volley League for Women an Expectations Round between each other with two teams remain in the 1st Tier and two teams descending to the 2nd League.

Relegation 
In the relegation, teams from the Expectations Round, 2. Bundesliga North and South meet.

Under-21 competition 
In a weekend tournament, a maximum of ten teams play the Austrian championship title in this class.

List of Champions

References

External links
  Austrian League. women.volleybox.net
 Austrian Volleyball Association (ÖVV)
 Hall of Fame

 

Austria
1953 establishments in Austria
Volleyball in Austria 
Austrian League
Professional sports leagues in Austria